Tushar Arun Gandhi (born 17  January 1960) is an Indian author and son of Arun Manilal Gandhi, thus great-grandson of Mahatma Gandhi.  In March 2005, he led the 75th anniversary re-enactment of the Dandi March. From 2007 to 2012, he was the Goodwill Ambassador of the CISRI-ISP Intergovernmental Institution for the use of Micro-algae Spirulina Against Malnutrition.

Early life
Tushar Arun Gandhi was born on 17 January 1960, in Shegaon, Maharashtra, to Arun and Surnanda Gandhi. His father was an actor and his mother was a researcher. Tushar was raised in the Mumbai suburb of Santacruz. He studied at Adarsh Vinay Mandir, a local Gujarati-medium school. He holds a diploma in printing from the Government Institute of Printing Technology, Mumbai.

Personal life 
Gandhi resides in Mumbai. In 1985, he married Sonal Desai.  Together, they had 2 children. A son Vivan Gandhi and daughter Kasturi Gandhi. Kasturi was so named after Kasturba Gandhi.

Career 
Tushar Gandhi is best known for having established in 1998 in Vadodara, Gujarat the Mahatma Gandhi Foundation. It is now located in Mumbai (and he is still its President). 

Since 1996 he has served as President of the Lok Seva Trust, an NGO which a nephew of Mahatma Gandhi had establish in central Bombay in the mid-1950s for the welfare to textile-mill labourers. 

In 2000, Tushar portrayed himself in a fictional Tamil - Hindi movie directed by Kamal Hassan, "Hey Ram". 

In 2001, Tushar Gandhi negotiated with American marketing firm CMG Worldwide the use of the Mahatma’s image in an advertisement (aimed at university students) for a credit card company.  This perceived betrayal of Gandhian ideals was followed by a public outcry causing him to cancel the deal.

In 2009, he did likewise in a semi-fictional movie, "Road to Sangam," based on an episode in his own life. 

A nonfiction book by him, Let's Kill Gandhi, was published in 2007 and became for a few weeks a best seller in India.  Tushar in his book Let’s Kill Gandhi, blamed Brahmins in general for assassinating Mahatma Gandhi. Some critics claimed that the book defamed all Brahmins. Tushar has said he was misquoted and his claims relate only to "a certain group of Brahmins from Pune [who] were continuously attempting on the life of my great grandfather", rather than to Brahmins in general.

In 2008 he was appointed Chairman of the Australian Indian Rural Development Foundation (AIRDF). 

He is trustee at Maharashtra Gandhi Smarak Nidhi since 2014. 

In 2018 he played a significant role in petitioning successfully the Supreme Court of India to direct the states and Union Territories to comply with its orders to curb cow-vigilante lynch mobs. 

In 2019 he became a Director of the Gandhi Research Foundation in Jalgaon, Maharashtra.

References

External links

 Official website of Tushar Gandhi
 Tushar Gandhi takes the plunge into politics
 Tushar Gandhi prays at Mahatma Gandhi's birthplace
 Being Mahatma’s descendants brings bouquets and brickbats
 Tushar Gandhi on Twitter

1960 births
Living people
Tushar
Gandhians
Mithibai College alumni
Indian National Congress politicians